Marcelo Antônio Sangaletti (born 1 June 1971), also known as Sangaletti, is a Brazilian retired professional footballer and manager who played as a center back and a defensive midfielder. He last managed Esporte Clube Noroeste.

Sangaletti was born in Dois Córregos and started his professional career with Juventus. He had spells with Guarani, Náutico, Sport, Corinthians and Internacional, where he played his last three seasons.

External links 
 
 Sangaletti at playmakerstats.com (English version of ogol.com.br)

1971 births
Living people
Brazilian footballers
Association football central defenders
Guarani FC players
Sport Club Internacional players
Santos FC players
Sport Club do Recife players
Sport Club Corinthians Paulista players